Scea erasa is a moth of the family Notodontidae. It is found in South America, including and possibly limited to Peru.

External links
Species page at Tree of Life project

Notodontidae of South America
Moths described in 1918